Pelagodoxeae is a tribe of plants in the family Arecaceae found in Oceania, namely in New Guinea and the Marquesas Islands. The tribe has two monotypic genera, which are:

Pelagodoxa – Marquesas Islands
Sommieria – NW New Guinea

See also 
 List of Arecaceae genera

References

External links 

 
Monocot tribes
Arecoideae